Forgotten Voices of the Blitz and the Battle of Britain uses material from Imperial War Museum’s sound archive.  It was written by Joshua Levine to bring together interviews with people who lived through the Blitz and the Battle of Britain.  It features interviews with soldiers, airmen, fire-fighters, air-raid wardens and civilians, people in the air and on the ground.

External links
 Forgotten Voices website
 Imperial War Museum website

2006 non-fiction books
Oral history books
Britain
Books of interviews
British non-fiction books
Ebury Publishing books